Archaeological evidence shows Jainism was a significant religion in Bengal during the early historic period.

Sarak

Saraks are a Jain community in Bihar, Bengal, Orissa and Jharkhand. They have been followers of Jainism since ancient times; however, they were isolated and separated from the main body of the Jain community in western, northern and southern India.

According to Ramesh Chandra Majumder, the Jain scholar Bhadrabahu, the second Louhacharya and the author of Kalpa Sutra may have come from the Sarak community. The Saraks were agriculturists and moneylenders having landed properties.

They have continued to remain vegetarian even though this practice is uncommon among other communities in the region. Saraks have Parshva as a favored patron and recite the Ṇamōkāra mantra. The 24th Tirthankara Mahavira visited this region according to the Kalpa Sūtra.

The Saraks lost contact with Jains in the rest of India after its conquest by Ikhtiyar Uddin Muhammad bin Bakhtiyar Khilji. Contact with the Digambara Bundelkhand Jains was reestablished when the Parwars Manju Chaudhary (1720–1785) was appointed the governor of Cuttack by the Maratha Empire.

In 2009, more than 165 Sarak Jains living in parts of West Bengal, Bihar and Jharkhand visited the ancient Jain pilgrimage center of Shravanabelagola. A special function to welcome the Sarak Jains was organised at Shravanabelagola.

Population

Population by district 

Most of the Bengali Jains now live in the Indian state of West Bengal.

Trends

Temples

See also

Jain community
 Sarak
 Basudih

Re

Jain communities
Jainism in India
History of Bengal